Reid Harrison is an American screenwriter and television producer. He has written for television shows such as The PJs, George and Leo, Men Behaving Badly, Brother's Keeper, Gary & Mike, George of the Jungle, Pinky and the Brain, Duckman, Drawn Together, The Mullets, 3 South, Angelo Rules, Sonic Boom, Danger Mouse and The Unstoppable Yellow Yeti.

He was supervising producer on the Netflix show, Disenchantment. He was also story editor for The Simpsons and wrote the season eight episode "The Springfield Files" and the season nineteen episode "Papa Don't Leech".

Reid graduated from the College of William & Mary in 1982.

References

External links

American television writers
American male television writers
College of William & Mary alumni
Living people
Year of birth missing (living people)